The 2019 Tampa Bay Rays season was the Rays' 22nd season of Major League Baseball, and the 12th as the "Rays" (all at Tropicana Field). The Rays clinched a spot in the playoffs for the first time since 2013 and defeated the Oakland Athletics in the Wild Card Game 5–1. They then lost in the Division Series to the Houston Astros 3–2.

American League East

American League Wild Card

Record against opponents

Game log

Regular season 

|-style="background:#fbb"
| 1 || March 28 || Astros || 1–5 || Verlander (1–0) || Snell (0–1) || — || 25,025 || 0–1 || L1
|-style="background:#bfb"
| 2 || March 29 || Astros || 4–2 || Morton (1–0) || Cole (0–1) || Alvarado (1) || 13,059 || 1–1 || W1
|-style="background:#bfb"
| 3 || March 30 || Astros || 3–1 || Glasnow (1–0) || McHugh (0–1) || Alvarado (2) || 16,010 || 2–1 || W2 
|-style="background:#bfb"
| 4 || March 31 || Astros || 3–1 || Chirinos (1–0) || Miley (0–1) || Castillo (1) || 18,473 || 3–1 || W3
|-style="background:#bfb"
| 5 || April 1 || Rockies || 7–1 || Yarbrough (1–0) || Bettis (0–1) || — || 10,860 || 4–1 || W4
|-style="background:#bfb"
| 6 || April 2 || Rockies || 4–0 || Snell (1–1) || Freeland (1–1) || — || 10,933 || 5–1 || W5
|-style="background:#fbb"
| 7 || April 3 || Rockies || 0–1 (11) || Davis (1–0) || Roe (0–1) || — || 11,093 || 5–2 || L1
|-style="background:#bfb"
| 8 || April 5 || @ Giants || 5–2 || Glasnow (2–0) || Rodríguez (1–1) ||  Alvarado (3) || 41,067 || 6–2 || W1
|-style="background:#fbb"
| 9 || April 6 || @ Giants || 4–6 || Bergen (1–0) || Yarbrough (1–1) || Smith (3) || 31,828 || 6–3 || L1
|-style="background:#bfb"
| 10 || April 7 || @ Giants || 3–0 || Chirinos (2–0) || Pomeranz (0–1) || Alvarado (4) || 31,574 || 7–3 || W1
|-style="background:#bfb"
| 11 || April 8 || @ White Sox || 5–1 || Snell (2–1) || Rodón (1–2) || Wood (1) || 11,734 || 8–3 || W2
|-style="background:#bfb"
| 12 || April 9 || @ White Sox || 10–5 || Morton (2–0) || Santana (0–1) || — || 10,799 || 9–3 || W3
|-style="background:#bfb"
| 13 || April 10 || @ White Sox || 9–1 || Glasnow (3–0) || López (0–2) || Beeks (1) || 11,107 || 10–3 || W4
|-style="background:#bfb"
| 14 || April 12 || @ Blue Jays || 11–7 || Yarbrough (2–1) || Thornton (0–1) || — || 17,326 || 11–3 || W5
|-style="background:#fbb"
| 15 || April 13 || @ Blue Jays || 1–3 || Pannone (1–2) || Roe (0–2) || Giles (4) || 20,771 || 11–4 || L1
|-style="background:#bfb"
| 16 || April 14 || @ Blue Jays || 8–4 || Kolarek (1–0) || Stroman (0–3) || — || 20,512 || 12–4 || W1
|-style="background:#bfb"
| 17 || April 16 || Orioles || 4–2 || Glasnow (4–0) || Bundy (0–2) || Castillo (2) || 9,842 || 13–4 || W2
|-style="background:#bfb"
| 18 || April 17 || Orioles || 8–1 || Chirinos (3–0) || Hess (1–3) || — || 9,028 || 14–4 || W3
|-style="background:#fbb"
| 19 || April 18 || Orioles || 5–6 (11) || Means (2–2) || Castillo (0–1) || — || 9,081 || 14–5 || L1
|-style="background:#fbb"
| 20 || April 19 || Red Sox || 4–6 || Workman (1–1) || Castillo (0–2) || Brasier (4) || 21,343 || 14–6 || L2
|-style="background:#fbb"
| 21 || April 20 || Red Sox || 5–6 || Barnes (2–0) || Alvarado (0–1) || Brasier (5) || 22,940 || 14–7 || L3
|-style="background:#fbb"
| 22 || April 21 || Red Sox || 3–4 (11) || Walden (3–0) || Alvarado (0–2) || Brasier (6) || 18,740 || 14–8 || L4
|-style="background:#bfb"
| 23 || April 22 || Royals || 6–3 || Font (1–0) || Keller (2–2) || Pagán (1) || 9,914 || 15–8 || W1
|-style="background:#bfb"
| 24 || April 23 || Royals || 5–2 || Beeks (1–0) || Bailey (2–2) || Pagán (2) || 8,298 || 16–8 || W2
|-style="background:#fbb"
| 25 || April 24 || Royals || 2–10 || Junis (2–2) || Snell (2–2) || — || 9,502 || 16–9 || L1
|-style="background:#bbb"
| — || April 26 || @ Red Sox || colspan=7|Postponed (rain); Makeup: June 8
|-style="background:#bfb"
| 26 || April 27 || @ Red Sox || 2–1 || Morton (3–0) || Price (1–2) || Pagán (3) || 34,733 || 17–9 || W1
|-style="background:#bfb"
| 27 || April 28 || @ Red Sox || 5–2 || Glasnow (5–0) || Sale (0–5) || Castillo (3) || 33,823 || 18–9 || W2
|-style="background:#bfb"
| 28 || April 29 || @ Royals || 8–5 || Chirinos (4–0) || Keller (2–3) || — || 11,744 || 19–9 || W3
|-style="background:#bbb"
| — || April 30 || @ Royals || colspan=7|Postponed (rain); Makeup: May 1
|-

|-style="background:#fbb"
| 29 || May 1   || @ Royals || 2–3 || Junis (3–2) || Stanek (0–1) || Ian Kennedy (2) || 11,141 || 19–10 || L1
|-style="background:#fbb"
| 30 || May 1   || @ Royals || 2–8 || Sparkman (1–1) || Snell (2–3) || — || 11,141 || 19–11 || L2
|-style="background:#bfb"
| 31 || May 2 || @ Royals || 3–1 || Kolarek (2–0) || Peralta (2–2) || Castillo (4) || 23,343 || 20–11 || W1
|-style="background:#bfb"
| 32 || May 3 || @ Orioles || 7–0 || Glasnow (6–0) || Straily (1–2) || — || 10,034 || 21–11 || W2
|-style="background:#fbb"
| 33 || May 4 || @ Orioles || 0–3 || Bundy (1–4) || Chirinos (4–1) || Givens (3) || 15,241 || 21–12 || L1
|-style="background:#bbb"
| – || May 5 || @ Orioles || colspan=7|Postponed (rain); Makeup: July 13
|-style="background:#bfb"
| 34 || May 6 || Diamondbacks || 12–1 || Snell (3–3) || Kelly (3–3) || — || 8,124 || 22–12 || W1
|-style="background:#bfb"
| 35 || May 7 || Diamondbacks || 6–3 || Beeks (2–0) || Clarke (0–1) || — || 8,059 || 23–12 || W2
|-style="background:#fbb"
| 36 || May 8 || Diamondbacks || 2–3 (13) || Bradley (2–3) || Kolarek (2–1) || Godley (1) || 8,663 || 23–13 || L1
|-style="background:#fbb"
| 37 || May 10 || Yankees || 3–4 || Germán (7–1) || Glasnow (6–1) || Chapman (9) || 20,846 || 23–14 || L2
|-style="background:#bfb"
| 38 || May 11 || Yankees || 7–2 || Chirinos (5–1) || Holder (2–1) || — || 25,025 || 24–14 || W1
|-style="background:#fbb"
| 39 || May 12 || Yankees || 1–7 || Tanaka (3–3) || Snell (3–4) || — || 25,025 || 24–15 || L1
|-style="background:#bfb"
| 40 || May 14 || @ Marlins || 4–0 || Morton (4–0) || Smith (3–1) || — || 6,306 || 25–15 || W1
|-style="background:#bfb"
| 41 || May 15 || @ Marlins || 1–0 || Beeks (3–0) || Ureña (1–6) || Castillo (5) || 5,947 || 26–15 || W2
|-style="background:#fbb"
| 42 || May 17 || @ Yankees || 3–4 || Holder (3–1) || Alvarado (0–3) || — || 41,281 || 26–16 || L1
|-style="background:#bfb"
| 43 || May 18 || @ Yankees || 2–1 (11) || Wood (1–0) || Cessa (0–1) || Alvarado (5) || 43,079 || 27–16 || W1
|-style="background:#fbb"
| 44 || May 19 || @ Yankees || 5–13 || Ottavino (2–1) || Castillo (0–3) || Adams (1) || 43,032 || 27–17 || L1
|-style="background:#fbb"
| 45 || May 21 || Dodgers || 3–7 || Kershaw (4–0) || Wood (1–1) || — || 15,682 || 27–18 || L2
|-style="background:#bfb"
| 46 || May 22 || Dodgers || 8–1 || Pagán (1–0) || Floro (1–1) || — || 12,826 || 28–18 || W1
|-style="background:#bfb"
| 47 || May 23 || @ Indians || 7–2 || Yarbrough (3–1) || Plutko (1–1) || — || 18,884 || 29–18 || W2
|-style="background:#fbb"
| 48 || May 24 || @ Indians || 1–3 || Cole (2–1) || Alvarado (0–4) || Brad Hand (13) || 24,084 || 29–19 || L1
|-style="background:#bfb"
| 49 || May 25 || @ Indians || 6–2 || Morton (5–0) || Carrasco (4–5) || — || 25,882 || 30–19 || W1
|-style="background:#bfb"
| 50 || May 26 || @ Indians || 6–3 || Beeks (4–0) || Bauer (4–4) || Alvarado (6) || 20,288 || 31–19 || W2
|-style="background:#bfb"
| 51 || May 27 || Blue Jays || 8–3 || Chirinos (5–2) || Sanchez (3–5) || — || 15,883 || 32–19 || W3
|-style="background:#bfb"
| 52 || May 28 || Blue Jays || 3–1 || Yarbrough (4–1) || Richard (0–1) || Castillo (6) || 5,786 || 33–19 || W4
|-style="background:#bfb"
| 53 || May 29 || Blue Jays || 4–3 (11) || Castillo (1–3) || Shafer (0–1) || — || 6,166 || 34–19 || W5
|-style="background:#bfb"
| 54 || May 30 || Twins || 14–3 || Morton (6–0) || Pérez (7–2) ||  || 8,076 || 35–19 || W6
|-style="background:#fbb"
| 55 || May 31 || Twins || 3–5 || Rogers (2–1) || Castillo (1–4) || — || 14,375 || 35–20 || L1
|-

|-style="background:#fbb"
| 56 || June 1 || Twins || 2–6 || Gibson (6–2) || Chirinos (6–2) || — || 14,381 || 35–21 || L2
|-style="background:#fbb"
| 57 || June 2 || Twins || 7–9 || Odorizzi (8–2) || Yarbrough (4–2) || Rogers (5) || 14,616 || 35–22 || L3
|-style="background:#fbb"
| 58 || June 4 || @ Tigers || 6–9 || Carpenter (1–2) || Snell (3–5) ||  Greene (19) || 15,420 || 35–23 || L4
|-style="background:#bfb"
| 59 || June 5 || @ Tigers || 4–0 || Morton (7–0) || Turnbull (3–5) || — || 14,272 || 36–23 || W1
|-style="background:#bfb"
| 60 || June 6 || @ Tigers || 6–1 || Beeks (5–0) || Norris (2–5) || — || 21,442 || 37–23 || W2
|-style="background:#bfb"
| 61 || June 7 || @ Red Sox || 5–1 || Chirinos (7–2) || Porcello (4–6) || — || 36,803 || 38–23 || W3
|-style="background:#bfb"
| 62 || June 8  || @ Red Sox || 9–2 || Yarbrough (5–2) || Smith (0–2) || — || 35,564 || 39–23 || W4
|-style="background:#fbb"
| 63 || June 8  || @ Red Sox || 1–5 || Price (4–2) || Poche (0–1) || — || 37,048 || 39–24 || L1
|-style="background:#bfb"
| 64 || June 9 || @ Red Sox || 6–1 || Snell (4–5) || Rodríguez (6–4) || — || 34,643 || 40–24 || W1
|-style="background:#bfb"
| 65 || June 10 || Athletics || 6–2 || Morton (8–0) || Anderson (0–1) || — || 16,091 || 41–24 || W2
|-style="background:#fbb"
| 66 || June 11 || Athletics || 3–4 || Fiers (6–3) || Pagán (1–1) || Treinen (15) || 11,132 || 41–25 || L1
|-style="background:#fbb"
| 67 || June 12 || Athletics || 2–6 || Hendriks (3–0) || Kolarek (2–2) || — || 17,946 || 41–26 || L2
|-style="background:#fbb"
| 68 || June 13 || Angels || 3–5 || Skaggs (5–6) || Yarbrough (5–3) || Bedrosian (1) || 15,291 || 41–27 || L3
|-style="background:#bfb"
| 69 || June 14 || Angels || 9–4 || Pagán (2–1) || Buttrey (4–3) || — || 21,598 || 42–27 || W1
|-style="background:#fbb"
| 70 || June 15 || Angels || 3–5 || Suárez (2–1) || Morton (8–1) || Robles (10) || 22,320 || 42–28 || L1
|-style="background:#bfb"
| 71 || June 16 || Angels || 6–5 || Poche (1–1) || Canning (2–3) || Castillo (7) || 20,508 || 43–28 || W1
|-style="background:#fbb"
| 72 || June 17 || @ Yankees || 0–3 || Tanaka (5–5) || Chirinos (7–3) || — || 39,042 || 43–29 || L1
|-style="background:#fbb"
| 73 || June 18 || @ Yankees || 3–6 || Happ (7–3) || Roe (0–3) || Chapman (19) || 40,479 || 43–30 || L2
|-style="background:#fbb"
| 74 || June 19 || @ Yankees || 1–12 || Sabathia (4–4) || Snell (4–6) || — || 41,144 || 43–31 || L3
|-style="background:#fbb"
| 75 || June 20 || @ Athletics || 4–5 || Trivino (3–5) || Castillo (1–5) || — || 12,351 || 43–32 || L4
|-style="background:#bfb"
| 76 || June 21 || @ Athletics || 5–3 || Pruitt (1–0) || Anderson (0–2) || Pagán (4) || 16,126 || 44–32 || W1
|-style="background:#fbb"
| 77 || June 22 || @ Athletics || 2–4 || Petit (2–1) || Castillo (1–6) || Liam Hendriks (1) || 26,623 || 44–33 || L1
|-style="background:#bfb"
| 78 || June 23 || @ Athletics || 8–2 || Yarbrough (6–3) || Anderson (7–5) || — || 17,006 || 45–33 || W1
|-style="background:#fbb"
| 79 || June 25 || @ Twins || 4–9 || Gibson (8–4) || Snell (4–7) || — || 31,963 || 45–34 || L1
|-style="background:#fbb"
| 80 || June 26 || @ Twins || 4–6 || May (3–1) || Morton (8–2) || Rogers (10) || 31,650 || 45–35 || L2
|-style="background:#bfb"
| 81 || June 27 || @ Twins || 5–2 (18) || Yarbrough (7–3) || Harper (3–1) || — || 31,317 || 46–35 || W1
|-style="background:#fbb"
| 82 || June 28 || Rangers || 0–5 || Lynn (10–3) || Chirinos (7–4) || — || 13,955 || 46–36 || L1
|-style="background:#bfb"
| 83 || June 29 || Rangers || 5–2 || McKay (1–0) || Sampson (6–5) || — || 16,655 || 47–36 || W1
|-style="background:#bfb"
| 84 || June 30 || Rangers || 6–2 || Snell (5–7) || Chavez (3–3) || — || 11,234 || 48–36 || W2
|-

|-style="background:#bfb"
| 85 || July 1 || Orioles || 6–3 || Kolarek (3–2) || Kline (1–4) || Alvarado (7) || 20,441 || 49–36 || W3
|-style="background:#bfb"
| 86 || July 2 || Orioles || 6–3 || Morton (9–2) || Wojciechowski (0–1) || — || 20,925 || 50–36 || W4
|-style="background:#fbb"
| 87 || July 3 || Orioles || 6–9 || Givens (1–4) || Alvarado (0–5) || Armstrong (2) || 21,545 || 50–37 || L1
|-style="background:#fbb"
| 88 || July 4 || Yankees || 4–8 (10) || Chapman (2–1) || Drake (0–1) || Hale (2) || 21,974 || 50–38 || L2
|-style="background:#fbb"
| 89 || July 5 || Yankees || 4–8 (11) || Hale (2–0) || Stanek (0–2) || Chapman (24) || 22,182 || 50–39 || L3
|-style="background:#bfb"
| 90 || July 6 || Yankees || 4–3 || Poche (2–1) || Green (2–3) || — || 21,477 || 51–39 || W1
|-style="background:#bfb"
| 91 || July 7 || Yankees || 2–1 || Morton (10–2) || Paxton (5–4) || Pagán (5) || 20,091 || 52–39 || W2
|- style="text-align:center; background:#bbcaff;"
| colspan="10" | 90th All-Star Game in Cleveland
|-style="background:#bfb"
| 92 || July 12 || @ Orioles || 16–4 || Chirinos (8–4) || Bundy (4–11) || — || 22,422 || 53–39 || W3
|-style="background:#fbb"
| 93 || July 13  || @ Orioles || 1–2 || Bleier (1–0) || Poche (2–2) || Givens (7) || 22,596 || 53–40 || L1
|-style="background:#bfb"
| 94 || July 13  || @ Orioles || 12–4 || Morton (11–2) || Means (7–5) || — || 24,810 || 54–40 || W1
|-style="background:#bfb"
| 95 || July 14 || @ Orioles || 4–1 || Yarbrough (8–3) || Eshelman (0–1) || Pagán (6) || 14,082 || 55–40 || W2
|-style="background:#bfb"
| 96 || July 15 || @ Yankees || 5–4 || Kittredge (1–0) || Chapman (2–2) || Drake (1) || 43,173 || 56–40 || W3
|-style="background:#fbb"
| 97 || July 16 || @ Yankees || 3–8 || Hale (3–0) || Poche (2–3) || — || 40,401 || 56–41 || L1
|-style="background:#bbb"
| – || July 17 || @ Yankees || colspan=7|Postponed (rain); Makeup: July 18
|-style="background:#fbb"
| 98 || July 18  || @ Yankees || 2–6 || Germán (12–2) || Chirinos (8–5) || — || 40,504 || 56–42 || L2
|-style="background:#fbb"
| 99 || July 18  || @ Yankees || 1–5 || Cessa (1–1) || Morton (11–3) || — || 40,504 || 56–43 || L3
|-style="background:#fbb"
| 100 || July 19 || White Sox || 2–9 || López (5–8) || McKay (1–1) || — || 16,971 || 56–44 || L4
|-style="background:#fbb"
| 101 || July 20 || White Sox || 1–2 (11) || Fry (2–4) || Kolarek (3–3) || Colomé (21) || 16,388 || 56–45 || L5
|-style="background:#bfb"
| 102 || July 21 || White Sox || 4–2 || Snell (6–7) || Cease (1–2) || Kolarek (1) || 14,987 || 57–45 || W1
|-style="background:#fbb"
| 103 || July 22 || Red Sox || 4–9 || Rodríguez (12–4) || Beeks (5–1) || — || 10,966 || 57–46 || L1
|-style="background:#fbb"
| 104 || July 23 || Red Sox || 4–5 || Sale (5–9) || Poche (2–4) || Walden (2) || 15,876 || 57–47 || L2
|-style="background:#bfb"
| 105 || July 24 || Red Sox || 3–2 || Morton (12–3) || Price (7–4) || Pagán (7) || 24,161 || 58–47 || W1
|-style="background:#bfb"
| 106 || July 26 || @ Blue Jays || 3–1 || Yarbrough (9–3) || Waguespack (1–1) || Poche (1) || 22,767 || 59–47 || W2
|-style="background:#fbb"
| 107 || July 27 || @ Blue Jays || 9–10 (12) || Hudson (6–2) || Pagán (2–2) || — || 28,204 || 59–48 || L1
|-style="background:#bfb"
| 108 || July 28 || @ Blue Jays || 10–9 || Roe (1–3) || Hudson (6–3) || Castillo (8) || 24,542 || 60–48 || W1
|-style="background:#bfb"
| 109 || July 30 || @ Red Sox || 6–5 || Kolarek (4–3) || Taylor (0–1) || Pagán (8) || 36,412 || 61–48 || W2
|-style="background:#bfb"
| 110 || July 31 || @ Red Sox || 8–5 || Yarbrough (10–3) || Porcello (9–8) || Roe (1) || 33,046 || 62–48 || W3
|-

|-style="background:#bfb"
| 111 || August 1 || @ Red Sox || 9–4 || McKay (2–1) || Cashner (10–6) || — || 37,255 || 63–48 || W4
|-style="background:#bfb"
| 112 || August 3 || Marlins || 8–6 || Anderson (3–4) || García (1–2) || Pagán (9) || 14,092 || 64–48 || W5
|-style="background:#bfb"
| 113 || August 4 || Marlins || 7–2 || Chirinos (9–5) || Smith (7–5) || — || 14,819 || 65–48 || W6
|-style="background:#fbb"
| 114 || August 5 || Blue Jays || 0–2 || Waguespack (3–1) || Morton (12–4) || Law (2) || 11,948 || 65–49 || L1
|-style="background:#bfb"
| 115 || August 6 || Blue Jays || 7–6 (10) || Castillo (2–6) || Boshers (0–2) || — || 9,434 || 66–49 || W1
|-style="background:#fbb"
| 116 || August 7 || Blue Jays || 3–4 || Stewart (1–0) || McKay (2–2) || Giles (15) || 10,299 || 66–50 || L1
|-style="background:#bfb"
| 117 || August 9 || @ Mariners || 5–3 || Drake (1–1) || Bass (1–4) || Pagán (10) || 26,774 || 67–50 || W1
|-style="background:#bfb"
| 118 || August 10 || @ Mariners || 5–4 || Morton (13–4) || Milone (1–7) || Pagán (11) || 33,895 || 68–50 || W2
|-style="background:#bfb"
| 119 || August 11 || @ Mariners || 1–0 || Yarbrough (11–3) || LeBlanc (6–6) || Pagán (12) || 24,219 || 69–50 || W3
|-style="background:#bfb"
| 120 || August 12 || @ Padres || 10–4 || Pruitt (2–0) || Lucchesi (7–7) || — || 21,301 || 70–50 || W4
|-style="background:#bfb"
| 121 || August 13 || @ Padres || 7–5 || Anderson (4–4) || Báez (0–1) || Pagán (13) || 25,261 || 71–50 || W5
|-style="background:#fbb"
| 122 || August 14 || @ Padres || 2–7 || Quantrill (6–6) || Beeks (5–2) || — || 22,886 || 71–51 || L1
|-style="background:#fbb"
| 123 || August 16 || Tigers || 0–2 || VerHagen (3–2) || Morton (13–5) || Jiménez (3) || 13,717 || 71–52 || L2
|-style="background:#bfb"
| 124 || August 17 || Tigers || 1–0 (13) || Poche (3–4) || Hall (0–1) || — || 17,228 || 72–52 || W1
|-style="background:#bfb"
| 125 || August 18 || Tigers || 5–4 || Alvarado (1–5) || Jiménez (3–7) || — || 16,634 || 73–52 || W2
|-style="background:#fbb"
| 126 || August 19 || Mariners || 3–9 || Gonzales (13–10) || McKay (2–3) || — || 9,152 || 73–53 || L1
|-style="background:#fbb"
| 127 || August 20 || Mariners || 4–7 || Milone (3–7) || Beeks (5–3) || Magill (2) || 7,455 || 73–54 || L2
|-style="background:#bfb"
| 128 || August 21 || Mariners || 7–6 || Pagán (3–2) ||  Magill (3–1) || — || 7,827 || 74–54 || W1
|-style="background:#bfb"
| 129 || August 22 || @ Orioles || 5–2 || Drake (2–1) || Castro (1–2) || Pagán (14) || 8,153 || 75–54 || W2
|-style="background:#bfb"
| 130 || August 23 || @ Orioles || 7–1 || Richards (4–12) || Blach (0–2) || Slegers (1) || 14,762 || 76–54 || W3
|-style="background:#fbb"
| 131 || August 24 || @ Orioles || 1–7 || Means (9–9) || Alvarado (1–6) || — || 11,409 || 76–55 || L1
|-style="background:#fbb"
| 132 || August 25 || @ Orioles || 3–8 || Bundy (6–13) || Castillo (2–7) || — || 13,287 || 76–56 || L2
|-style="background:#fbb"
| 133 || August 27 || @ Astros || 1–15 || Verlander (16–5) || Morton (13–6) || — || 28,454 || 76–57 || L3
|-style="background:#fbb"
| 134 || August 28 || @ Astros || 6–8 || Harris (4–1) || Castillo (2–8) || — || 25,539 || 76–58 || L4
|-style="background:#bfb"
| 135 || August 29 || @ Astros || 9–8 || De León (1–0) || Devenski (2–3) || Pagán (15) || 33,051 || 77–58 || W1
|-style="background:#bfb"
| 136 || August 30 || Indians || 4–0 || Drake (3–1) || Bieber (12–7) || — || 15,294 || 78–58 || W2 
|-style="background:#bfb"
| 137 || August 31 || Indians || 9–6 || Beeks (6–3) || Plesac (7–5) || Pagán (16) || 13,327 || 79–58 || W3
|-

|-style="background:#bfb"
| 138 || September 1 || Indians || 8–2 || Morton (14–6) || Plutko (6–4) || — || 14,922 || 80–58 || W4
|-style="background:#bfb"
| 139 || September 2 || Orioles || 5–4 (10) || Poche (4–4) || Tate (0–1) || — || 10,566 || 81–58 || W5
|-style="background:#fbb"
| 140 || September 3  || Orioles || 2–4 || Blach (1–2) || Drake (3–2) || Bleier (3) || 6,844 || 81–59 || L1
|-style="background:#bfb"
| 141 || September 3  || Orioles || 2–0 || Beeks (7–3) || Ynoa (1–8) || Pagán (17) || 6,844 || 82–59 || W1
|-style="background:#bbb"
| – || September 4 || Orioles || colspan=7|Rescheduled to September 3 due to Hurricane Dorian
|-style="background:#bfb"
| 142 || September 5 || Blue Jays || 6–4 || Drake (4–2) || Boshers (0–3) || Pagán (18) || 5,962 || 83–59 || W2
|-style="background:#bfb"
| 143 || September 6 || Blue Jays || 5–0 || Fairbanks (1–2) || Buchholz (1–4) || Pagán (19) || 10,853 || 84–59 || W3
|-style="background:#bfb"
| 144 || September 7 || Blue Jays || 5–3 || Anderson (5–4) || Romano (0–2) || Drake (2) || 12,663 || 85–59 || W4
|-style="background:#bfb"
| 145 || September 8 || Blue Jays || 8–3 || Richards (5–12) || Waguespack (4–4) || — || 14,071 || 86–59 || W5
|-style="background:#bfb"
| 146 || September 10 || @ Rangers || 5–3 (11) || Pagán (4–2) || Clase (2–3) || Fairbanks (1) || 18,467 || 87–59 || W6
|-style="background:#fbb"
| 147 || September 11 || @ Rangers || 9–10 || Gibaut (1–0) || Poche (4–5) || Leclerc (12) || 19,746 || 87–60 || L1
|-style="background:#fbb"
| 148 || September 12 || @ Rangers || 4–6 || Farrell (1–0) || McKay (2–4) || Leclerc (13) || 18,222 || 87–61 || L2
|-style="background:#bfb"
| 149 || September 13 || @ Angels || 11–4 || Morton (15–6) || Heaney (4–5) || — || 39,914 || 88–61 || W1
|-style="background:#bfb"
| 150 || September 14 || @ Angels || 3–1 || Richards (6–12) || Barría (4–9) || Pagán (20) || 39,056 || 89–61 || W2
|-style="background:#fbb"
| 151 || September 15 || @ Angels || 4–6 || Ramirez (5–3) || Yarbrough (11–4) || Robles (21) || 36,709 || 89–62 || L1
|-style="background:#fbb"
| 152 || September 17 || @ Dodgers || 5–7 || Maeda (10–8) || Fairbanks (1–3) || Jansen (30) || 48,663 || 89–63 || L2
|-style="background:#bfb"
| 153 || September 18 || @ Dodgers || 8–7 (11) || Poche (5–5) || Sborz (0–1) || Fairbanks (2) || 48,253 || 90–63 || W1
|-style="background:#bfb"
| 154 || September 20 || Red Sox || 5–4 (11) || Castillo (4–8) || Kelley (0–3) || — || 17,117 || 91–63 || W2
|-style="background:#bfb"
| 155 || September 21 || Red Sox || 5–4 (11) || Castillo (5–8) || Smith (0–3) || — || 18,179 || 92–63 || W3
|-style="background:#fbb"
| 156 || September 22 || Red Sox || 4–7 || Eovaldi (2–0) || Yarbrough (11–5) || — || 17,946 || 92–64 || L1
|-style="background:#bfb"
| 157 || September 23 || Red Sox || 7–4 || Pruitt (3–0) || Poyner (0–1) || Poche (2) || 8,779 || 93–64 || W1
|-style="background:#bfb"
| 158 || September 24 || Yankees || 2–1 (12) || Fairbanks (2–3) || Gearrin (1–3) || — || 16,699 || 94–64 || W2
|-style="background:#bfb"
| 159 || September 25 || Yankees || 4–0 || Morton (16–6) || Loáisiga (2–2) || — || 20,390 || 95–64 || W3
|-style="background:#bfb"
| 160 || September 27 || @ Blue Jays || 6–2 || Drake (5–2) || Zeuch (1–2) || — || 16,348 || 96–64 || W4
|-style="background:#fbb"
| 161 || September 28 || @ Blue Jays || 1–4 || Thornton (6–9) || Yarbrough (11–6) || Giles (23) || 20,293 || 96–65 || L1
|-style="background:#fbb"
| 162 || September 29 || @ Blue Jays || 3–8 || Buchholz (2–5) || Snell (6–8) || — || 25,738 || 96–66 || L2
|-

|- style="text-align:center;"
| Legend:       = Win       = Loss       = PostponementBold = Rays team member

Postseason 

|- style="background:#bfb"
| October 2 || @ Athletics || 5–1 || Morton (1–0) || Manaea (0–1) || — || RingCentral Coliseum54,005 || 1–0 ||W1   
|-

|- style="background:#fbb"
| 1 || October 4 || @ Astros || 2–6 || Verlander (1–0) || Glasnow (0–1) || — || Minute Maid Park43,360 || 0–1
|- style="background:#fbb" 
| 2 || October 5 || @ Astros || 1–3 || Cole (1–0) || Snell (0–1) || Harris (1) || Minute Maid Park43,378 || 0–2
|- style="background:#bfb"  
| 3 || October 7 || Astros || 10–3 || Morton (2–0) || Greinke (0–1) || — || Tropicana Field32,251 || 1–2
|- style="background:#bfb" 
| 4 || October 8 || Astros || 4–1 || Yarbrough (1–0) || Verlander (1–1) || Snell (1) || Tropicana Field32,178 || 2–2
|- style="background:#fbb" 
| 5 || October 10 || @ Astros || 1–6 || Cole (2–0) || Glasnow (0–2) || — || Minute Maid Park43,418 || 2–3
|-

Postseason rosters

| style="text-align:left" |
Pitchers: 4 Blake Snell 15 Emilio Pagán 20 Tyler Glasnow 38 Colin Poche 47 Oliver Drake 48 Ryan Yarbrough 50 Charlie Morton 52 Chaz Roe 63 Diego Castillo 70 Nick Anderson 
Catchers: 10 Mike Zunino 37 Travis d'Arnaud 
Infielders: 1 Willy Adames 2 Yandy Díaz 5 Matt Duffy 8 Brandon Lowe 18 Joey Wendle 21 Jesús Aguilar 26 Ji-man Choi 28 Daniel Robertson 43 Mike Brosseau 
Outfielders: 17 Austin Meadows 24 Avisaíl García 29 Tommy Pham 39 Kevin Kiermaier
|- valign="top"

| style="text-align:left" |
Pitchers: 4 Blake Snell 15 Emilio Pagán 20 Tyler Glasnow 38 Colin Poche 47 Oliver Drake 48 Ryan Yarbrough 49 Brendan McKay 50 Charlie Morton 52 Chaz Roe 63 Diego Castillo 70 Nick Anderson 72 Yonny Chirinos
Catchers: 10 Mike Zunino 37 Travis d'Arnaud
Infielders: 1 Willy Adames 2 Yandy Díaz 5 Matt Duffy 8 Brandon Lowe 9 Eric Sogard 18 Joey Wendle 26 Ji-man Choi
Outfielders: 17 Austin Meadows 24 Avisaíl García 29 Tommy Pham 39 Kevin Kiermaier
|- valign="top"

Roster

Farm system

Major League Baseball draft

The 2019 Major League Baseball (MLB) First-Year Player Draft began on Monday, June 3, 2019, and ended June 5. The draft assigned amateur baseball players to MLB teams.

References

External links
Tampa Bay Rays 2019 Schedule at MLB.com
2019 Tampa Bay Rays season at ESPN
2019 Tampa Bay Rays season at Baseball Reference

Tampa Bay Rays season
Tampa Bay Rays
Tampa Bay Rays seasons